Whippingham is a village and civil parish on the Isle of Wight. The population of the Civil Parish at the 2011 Census was 787.

Whippingham is best known for its connections with Queen Victoria, especially St Mildred's Church, redesigned by Prince Albert. The village became the centre of the royal estate supporting Osborne House and Barton Manor. The farms, school, almshouses, forge and cottages were rebuilt when they became part of the Queen's estate and Prince Albert had a 'model farm' built at Barton. Queen Victoria took a close interest in 'her people' in Whippingham, providing for them in sickness and in health. It is also the home to The Folly Inn.

Landmarks

St. Mildred's Church
St Mildred's Church is the Church of England parish church. Its close connection with Queen Victoria is reflected in the many memorials in the church and the churchyard which commemorate members of the Royal Family and the Royal Household. A side chapel is dedicated to the Battenberg/Mountbatten family. St Mildred's Church is now in a united benefice with St James's Church, East Cowes.

Barton Manor
Barton Manor is a Jacobean manor house in Whippingham, the most northerly of all manor houses on the Isle of Wight.

Isle of Wight Crematorium
The Isle of Wight Crematorium is in the parish — opened in 1961, it is the island's only such facility.

Governance
Whippingham is part of the electoral ward called Whippingham and Osborne. This ward covers much of East Cowes and at the 2011 Census had a population of 3,818.

Transport
Southern Vectis bus routes 4 and 5  link the village with the towns of East Cowes, Newport and Ryde.

See also
HMS Whippingham, a Ham class minesweeper

References

Further reading
The Book of Whippingham: Queen Victoria's Island Village, Sarah Burdett, Devon Books, July 2006

External links

Wooton Bridge Historical Association Wootton Bridge Historical - Historical Information for Wootton Bridge and the Isle of Wight

Villages on the Isle of Wight